Sheller is a surname. Notable people with the surname include:

Alexander Sheller (1838–1900), Russian writer
Marty Sheller (born 1940), American jazz trumpeter and arranger
Mimi Sheller (born 1967), American sociologist
William Sheller (born 1946), French classical composer and singer

See also
29614 Sheller, a main-belt asteroid
Clara Sheller, a French television series